Muckendorf-Wipfing is a municipality in the district of Tulln in the Austrian state of Lower Austria. On the south bank of the Danube, it is around 20 km northwest of Vienna.

Population

References

External links

Cities and towns in Tulln District